Francisco Rojas may refer to:

 Francisco de Rojas Zorrilla (1607–1648), Spanish dramatist
  (1835–1906), Chilean farmer and politician
  (1903–1951), Mexican writer
  (1909–1993), Chilean medical doctor
 Francisco Rojas Tollinchi (1911–1965), Puerto Rican poet, civic leader and journalist
 Francisco Rojas Gutiérrez (born 1944), Mexican politician
  (born 1949) Chilean political scientist
 Francisco Rojas Soto (born 1950), Olympic runner from Paraguay
 Francisco Rojas Toledo (born 1956), Mexican politician
 Francisco Rojas San Román (1958–2018), Mexican politician
 Francisco Rojas (footballer, born 1974), association football player from Chile
 Francisco Rojas (footballer, born 1991), association football player from Ecuador

See also 
 Francisca Rojas (born 1865), Argentine murderer